The 1996 Spanish general election was held on Sunday, 3 March 1996, to elect the 6th Cortes Generales of the Kingdom of Spain. All 350 seats in the Congress of Deputies were up for election, as well as 208 of 257 seats in the Senate.

Ever since forming a minority government after its victory in the 1993 election, the Spanish Socialist Workers' Party (PSOE) had been rocked by the unveiling of a string of corruption scandals, including the party's illegal financing, misuse of public funds to pay for undeclared bonuses to party officials and allegations of state terrorism. After Convergence and Union (CiU) withdrew their confidence and supply support to the PSOE-led government in June 1995, materializing in the 1996 General State Budget being voted down in October 1995, Prime Minister Felipe González was forced to precipitate the dissolution of the Cortes Generales and a snap election to be arranged for early 1996, fifteen months ahead of schedule.

The election resulted in the first PSOE defeat in a general election since 1982, but predictions of a landslide of the opposition José María Aznar's People's Party (PP) failed to materialize. The PP had been widely expected to make gains after resounding wins in the 1994 European Parliament election and 1995 local and regional elections, with polls suggesting Aznar winning an outright overall majority or coming short of it by few seats would be the most likely scenario. Instead, the election turned into the closest result between the two major parties in the Spanish democratic period to date; a PSOE comeback, fueled by a strong 77.4% voter turnout, the highest scored ever since, left the PP leading by just 1.2 percentage points and 300,000 votes, falling 20 seats short of an absolute majority. Julio Anguita's United Left (IU) also failed to meet expectations, despite scoring their best overall result in a general election since the Communist Party of Spain (PCE)'s results in 1979.

At 156 seats, this would be the worst performance for a winning party in the democratic period until the PP's result in the 2015 election. As a consequence of the election result, Aznar was forced to tone down his attacks to Catalan and Basque nationalists in order to garner their support for his investiture. After two months of negotiations, agreements were reached with CiU, the Basque Nationalist Party (PNV) and Canarian Coalition (CC), enabling for José María Aznar to become prime minister of a centre-right minority cabinet, marking the end of  years of Socialist government.

Overview

Electoral system
The Spanish Cortes Generales were envisaged as an imperfect bicameral system. The Congress of Deputies had greater legislative power than the Senate, having the ability to vote confidence in or withdraw it from a prime minister and to override Senate vetoes by an absolute majority of votes. Nonetheless, the Senate possessed a few exclusive (yet limited in number) functions—such as its role in constitutional amendment—which were not subject to the Congress' override. Voting for the Cortes Generales was on the basis of universal suffrage, which comprised all nationals over 18 years of age and in full enjoyment of their political rights.

For the Congress of Deputies, 348 seats were elected using the D'Hondt method and a closed list proportional representation, with an electoral threshold of three percent of valid votes—which included blank ballots—being applied in each constituency. Seats were allocated to constituencies, corresponding to the provinces of Spain, with each being allocated an initial minimum of two seats and the remaining 248 being distributed in proportion to their populations. Ceuta and Melilla were allocated the two remaining seats, which were elected using plurality voting. The use of the D'Hondt method might result in a higher effective threshold, depending on the district magnitude.

As a result of the aforementioned allocation, each Congress multi-member constituency was entitled the following seats:

For the Senate, 208 seats were elected using an open list partial block voting system, with electors voting for individual candidates instead of parties. In constituencies electing four seats, electors could vote for up to three candidates; in those with two or three seats, for up to two candidates; and for one candidate in single-member districts. Each of the 47 peninsular provinces was allocated four seats, whereas for insular provinces, such as the Balearic and Canary Islands, districts were the islands themselves, with the larger—Majorca, Gran Canaria and Tenerife—being allocated three seats each, and the smaller—Menorca, Ibiza–Formentera, Fuerteventura, La Gomera, El Hierro, Lanzarote and La Palma—one each. Ceuta and Melilla elected two seats each. Additionally, autonomous communities could appoint at least one senator each and were entitled to one additional senator per each million inhabitants.

Election date
The term of each chamber of the Cortes Generales—the Congress and the Senate—expired four years from the date of their previous election, unless they were dissolved earlier. The election decree was required to be issued no later than the twenty-fifth day prior to the date of expiry of the Cortes in the event that the prime minister did not make use of his prerogative of early dissolution. The decree was to be published on the following day in the Official State Gazette (BOE), with election day taking place on the fifty-fourth day from publication. The previous election was held on 6 June 1993, which meant that the legislature's term would expire on 6 June 1997. The election decree was required to be published in the BOE no later than 13 May 1997, with the election taking place on the fifty-fourth day from publication, setting the latest possible election date for the Cortes Generales on Sunday, 6 July 1997.

The prime minister had the prerogative to dissolve both chambers at any given time—either jointly or separately—and call a snap election, provided that no motion of no confidence was in process, no state of emergency was in force and that dissolution did not occur before one year had elapsed since the previous one. Additionally, both chambers were to be dissolved and a new election called if an investiture process failed to elect a prime minister within a two-month period from the first ballot. Barred this exception, there was no constitutional requirement for simultaneous elections for the Congress and the Senate. Still, as of  there has been no precedent of separate elections taking place under the 1978 Constitution.

Background

Economy
The legislature was marked by the international economic crisis of 1992-1993. While the economic situation in Spain since 1985 (coinciding with the accession of Spain into the European Communities) was very favorable and the evolutionary profile of per capita GDP was resembling that of the EU countries, from 1989 the GDP started to decrease markedly and the economy entered a cycle of recession. The five-year period 1985-1989 was characterized by a phase of expansive growth and massive inflow of foreign capital, attracted by high interest rates. Post-1989, however, saw unfavorable economic indicators, and recession and global economic crisis deeply affected unemployment rates.

From 1994, a remarkable recovery phase began, from a recession of 1.1% of GDP in 1993 to a growth rate of 2%. Although the economic situation was difficult, unemployment rate began a gradual decline, reaching the end of the legislature in 22% after reaching 24% in 1994. On the other hand, the inflation rate fell to 5.5% between 1994 and 1996, public debt stood at 68% and the deficit at 7.1%.

Corruption scandals
The 1993–96 legislature was marked by the unveiling of numerous corruption scandals involving the ruling Spanish Socialist Workers' Party. The eruption of corruption scandals had not been uncommon since the early 1990s, but was in this period when those seemed to affect directly to the incumbent PSOE leadership. These scandals would plague González's government throughout Felipe González's fourth tenure as Prime Minister of Spain.

Roldán scandal
On 23 November 1993, Spanish daily Diario 16 unveiled that Civil Guard Chief Director Luis Roldán had amassed a large patrimony, worth 400 million Pta and a large real estate assets, since assuming office in 1986, which contrasted with his net annual income of 400,000 Pta. Roldán then denounces a media campaign against him and defends the money is of legal origin, but proves unable to show evidence supporting his claims. The accusations lead to his dismissal by the government on 3 December. On 9 March 1994, El Mundo reveals that officers from the Ministry of the Interior had used money from the fondos reservados (Spanish for "reserved funds"), public funds destined to finance the fight against terrorism and drug trafficking and not subject to publicity, justification or external oversight, to make bonus payments to high-ranking officers from the Ministry; Roldán name appeared among those accused of having received such payments. In April, Diario 16 and El Mundo revealed that former President of Navarre Gabriel Urralburu had collected millionary commissions from construction companies in the awarding of public works during his government, with Roldán having also benefitted from it. Evidence now pointed to Roldán having used his office to amass a fortune through fraudulent means, which led to Roldán fleeing the country and in incumbent Interior Minister Antoni Asunción, responsible for monitoring Roldán, resigning as a consequence.

During his time missing, Roldán sent letters admitting the illegalities he had done and accusing other Interior Ministry high-ranking members of also having benefited from the reserved funds and warning that he was willing to "pull the rug out". In a handwritten letter sent to González himself and revealed by El Mundo daily on 17 June 1994, Roldán acknowledged having received a monthly payment of 10 million Pta from Rafael Vera, State Security Director until early 1994. Among those he accused was former Interior Minister José Luis Corcuera (1988–93), but also Prime Minister González, whom he pointed was "aware of everything". In the end, after ten months on the run, Luis Roldán was arrested on 27 February 1995 in Laos amidst claims that he and the Socialist government had reached an agreement in which Roldán would surrender himself in exchange of him being charged with just two crimes out of the seven attributable to him: bribery and embezzlement. This scandal came to be known as the "Laos papers", because the initial governmental version of his capture—that it had been done cooperatively with the Laotian government—was disproved by Laotian authorities. The PSOE government refused to recognize the veracity of these claims, but acknowledged that their initial version was "wrong". Roldán would later be convicted for the crimes of bribery, embezzlement, fraud, forgery and tax evasion.

Ibercorp case
Concurrently with the Roldán scandal, it is revealed on 5 April 1994 that former Governor of the Bank of Spain, Mariano Rubio, had a secret bank account in Ibercorp worth 130 million Ptas of undeclared money. Ibercorp had been an investment bank which had been intervened by the Bank of Spain in 1992 due to its involvement in obscure financial operations. Already in February 1992, it had been revealed that Rubio—then Governor of the Bank of Spain—and former Economy Minister Miguel Boyer had concealed from the National Securities Market Commission (CNMV) that both of them possessed stock shares in Ibercorp and used them to amass a fortune. Rubio had denied the accusations in 1992, which nonetheless cost him his post. However, the new revelations in 1994, which resulted in his criminal prosecution, put Felipe González and former Economy Minister Carlos Solchaga—who had backed Rubio in 1992, believing his claims of innocence, and were also ultimately responsible for his naming to the post—in a delicate political situation. Agriculture Minister Vicente Albero was also forced to resign his office in May 1994 after it was unveiled he had also possessed a secret account with undeclared money related to the scandal.

GAL case
In 1991, two policemen, José Amedo and Michel Domínguez, had been convicted for participating in the Liberation Antiterrorist Groups (GAL), death squads involved in a 'dirty war' against ETA in the 1983–87 period and thought to be secretly financed by the Socialist government. Initially thought to be acting independently, they confessed on 16 December 1994 to judge Baltasar Garzón that a number of former police and Interior Ministry officers were also involved in the GAL, showing evidence supporting their claims. Among those were former Interior Minister José Barrionuevo (1982–88), State Security Directors Julián Sancristóbal (1984–86) and Rafael Vera (1986–94), as well as former Secretary-General of the PSOE in Biscay Ricardo García Damborenea and a number of police officers accused of murder and embezzlement of public funds. Throughout early 1995, those accused except for Barrionuevo were arrested and court-questioned, leading to the 'GAL case' being re-opened by the Spanish National Court on 20 February in order to clarify whether the GAL were financed with money from the reserved funds. Barrionuevo accused Garzón, then instructing the case and who had contested the 1993 general election within the PSOE electoral lists, to be acting motivated by personal revenge against the party after political differences leading to his resignation as deputy in May 1994.

In May to July 1995 some of the defendants accused PM Felipe González of "knowing and allowing such activities", even pointing out that he could have been the person creating and financing the GAL. By 1996, however, the Spanish Supreme Court concluded that there was not proof of González's involvement and that the accusations were based on mere suspicions. Still, former Interior Minister José Barrionuevo and State Security Directors Rafael Vera and Julián Sancristóbal were convicted for the scandal.

Parliamentary composition
The Cortes Generales were officially dissolved on 9 January 1996, after the publication of the dissolution decree in the Official State Gazette. The tables below show the composition of the parliamentary groups in both chambers at the time of dissolution.

Parties and candidates
The electoral law allowed for parties and federations registered in the interior ministry, coalitions and groupings of electors to present lists of candidates. Parties and federations intending to form a coalition ahead of an election were required to inform the relevant Electoral Commission within ten days of the election call, whereas groupings of electors needed to secure the signature of at least one percent of the electorate in the constituencies for which they sought election, disallowing electors from signing for more than one list of candidates.

Below is a list of the main parties and electoral alliances which contested the election:

The Spanish Socialist Workers' Party (PSOE), United Left (IU), The Greens (LV), Nationalist and Ecologist Agreement (ENE) and Republican Left of Catalonia (ERC) formed the Ibiza and Formentera in the Senate alliance for the Senate election.

Campaign period

Party slogans

Opinion polls

Results

Congress of Deputies

Senate

Aftermath

Notes

References

General
1996 in Spain
1996
March 1996 events in Europe